Liangzhu is a town in Runan County, in southeastern Henan province, China, serviced by Henan Provincial Highway 219 (S219). , it has 2 residential communities and 16 villages under its administration.

See also 
 List of township-level divisions of Henan

References 

Township-level divisions of Henan
Runan County